Ranunculus gramineus, called the grass-leaved buttercup, is a species of flowering plant in the genus Ranunculus, native to the western Mediterranean; Morocco, Algeria, Tunisia, Portugal, Spain, France, Italy (including Sardinia), and Switzerland. It has gained the Royal Horticultural Society's Award of Garden Merit.

References

gramineus
Flora of Southwestern Europe
Flora of Italy
Flora of Switzerland
Flora of Morocco
Flora of Algeria
Flora of Tunisia
Taxa named by Carl Linnaeus
Plants described in 1753